The UEFS Futsal Championship or Eurofutsal was the main national futsal competition for the UEFS nations. It was first held in 1989.

Results

Performance by members

Medal count

Participation details 

Legend
 – Champions
 – Runners-up
 – Third place
 – Fourth place
5th-11th — Fifth to Eleventh place
Q — Qualified for upcoming tournament
 — Qualified but withdrew
 — Did not qualify
 — Did not enter / Withdrew from the European Championship / Banned
 — Hosts

References

External links
UEFS futsal home page (archived)
UEFS Facebook page

     
International futsal competitions
European championships
Futsal competitions in Europe
Men's sports competitions in Europe
1989 establishments in Europe